The Republican Party of the United States has held a variety of views on foreign policy and national defense over the course of its existence. Generally speaking, it has advocated for a more militaristic foreign policy (with the exception of isolationist and libertarian elements). Republican presidents have joined or started a number of wars over the course of American history, with mixed results.

Republicans supported Woodrow Wilson's call for American entry into World War I in 1917, complaining only that he was too slow to go to war. Republicans in 1919 opposed his call for entry into the League of Nations. A majority supported the League with reservations; a minority opposed membership on any terms. Republicans sponsored world disarmament in the 1920s, and isolationism in the 1930s. Most Republicans staunchly opposed intervention in World War II until the Japanese attack on Pearl Harbor in 1941. By 1945, however, internationalists became dominant in the party which supported the Cold War policies such as the Truman Doctrine, the Marshall Plan, and NATO.

1950s: Dwight Eisenhower

In the 1952 presidential election General Dwight D. Eisenhower, the NATO supreme commander, was drafted by the Republican Party to counter the candidacy of non-interventionist Senator Robert A. Taft. Eisenhower's campaign was a crusade against the Truman administration's policies regarding "Korea, Communism, and Corruption".

1970s: Nixon-Ford

Most Republicans supported Nixon-Ford-Kissinger policy of Vietnamization (letting South Vietnam do the fighting in the Vietnam War with American arms) and their policy of détente with the Soviet Union and China. The conservative wing, led by Reagan, denounced détente with the USSR but was defeated by Ford in the 1976 presidential primaries. When Ford lost his reelection bid to Jimmy Carter in the subsequent election, Reagan's approach dominated the party.

1981–1989: Ronald Reagan

Cold War

President Reagan reignited the Cold War. Détente was rejected in 1979 by President Jimmy Carter in the face of the Soviet invasion of Afghanistan. Reagan then ordered a massive buildup of the United States Armed Forces, especially the SDI project to undermine the Soviet nuclear threat by shooting down its missiles.

Grenada

On October 25, 1983, at the request of the regional governments, Reagan ordered Operation Urgent Fury, a military invasion of the small Caribbean island of Grenada, where over a thousand American students and their families were in residence. A Marxist coup d'état had overthrown the established government and shot its leader Maurice Bishop. This was the first actual rollback that destroyed a Communist regime and marked the continued escalation of tensions with the Soviet Union known as the Second Cold War. Democrats had been highly critical of Reagan's anti-Communism in Latin America, but this time Reagan had strong support from the voters and leading Democrats said the invasion was justified. It built the President's image of decisive strong action a year before the 1984 election, when Mondale said he too would have ordered the invasion. Indeed, Mondale attacked Senator Gary Hart, his chief opponent for the Democratic nomination, as isolationist and weak on fighting dictatorships.

Covert operations
Under a policy that came to be known as the Reagan Doctrine, Reagan and his administration also provided overt and covert aid to anti-communist resistance movements in an effort to "roll back" Soviet-backed communist governments in the Third World. The policy was politically controversial, with liberal Democrats especially angry with Reagan's operations in Latin America. Covert operations elsewhere, especially covert aid to the mujahideen in the Soviet-Afghan War, however, usually won bipartisan support.

1989–1993: George H. W. Bush

1990–91: Gulf War

On August 1, 1990, Ba'athist Iraq, led by Saddam Hussein, invaded Kuwait. President Bush formed an international coalition and secured UN approval to expel Iraq. On January 12, 1991, Congress voted approval for a military attack, Operation Desert Storm, by a narrow margin, with Republicans in favor and Democrats opposed. The vote in the House was 250–183, and in the Senate 52–47. In the Senate 42 Republicans and 10 Democrats voted yes to war, while 45 Democrats and two Republicans voted no. In the House 164 Republicans and 86 Democrats voted yes, and 179 Democrats, three Republicans and one Independent voted no. The war was short and successful, but Hussein was allowed to remain in power. Arab countries repaid all the American military costs.

1993–2001: Opposition politics

In the 1990s, Republicans in Congress split over the NATO military intervention in the Yugoslav Wars under Democratic President Bill Clinton. Examples of interventionist-minded Republicans are then Senate Majority Leader Bob Dole and Senator John McCain and examples of opposing figures are later Senate Majority Leader Trent Lott and House Majority Leader Dick Armey, the latter of which who called deployment in the Kosovo War "poorly considered and unlikely to achieve our desired ends". In 2000, successful Republican Presidential candidate George W. Bush ran on a platform that generally opposed U.S. involvement in foreign conflicts, saying that the U.S. didn't have the responsibly of "nation building". As such, he advocated U.S. military withdrawal from the Balkan NATO peacekeeping mission.

2001–2009: George W. Bush

Invasion of Afghanistan

After the September 11 attacks in 2001 in New York, Bush launched the War on Terrorism, in which the United States led an international coalition invaded Afghanistan, the base of terrorist Osama bin Laden. This invasion led to the toppling of the Taliban regime. After a surprise raid on bin Laden's compound on May 2, 2011, ordered by Barack Obama, bin Laden was killed and his body disposed of in the sea. There was bipartisan support for this action, with notable Republican and Democratic figures speaking out in support of the raid.

Invasion of Iraq

In 2003, following the bipartisan Iraq war resolution and the perceived issues regarding UN weapons inspectors, President Bush launched the invasion of Iraq, in conjunction with coalition partners, most notably, the United Kingdom. The invasion was described by Bush as being part of the general 'War on Terrorism'. Iraqi dictator Saddam Hussein was captured and executed, but his supporters and other opposing forces staged an insurgency that dragged on for years. It was a major election issue in 2004 (when Bush was reelected) and in 2006 and 2008 (when President Obama was first elected to the Presidency, and Democrats increased their numbers in both Houses of Congress).

Significant public support for the war effort existed in the early days among both parties and others, but opinions changed course soon with about half of Americans surveyed in November 2003 judging the end result as not worth it. The lack of expected stockpiles of weapons of mass destruction and the failures of the military occupation of Iraq altered voters' views. Polling done by CBS News on the ten-year anniversary of the U.S. invasion found that Republicans, by a margin of 61%, believed that the military action was the right thing to do, with majorities of Democrats and independents disagreeing. However, that same poll found that Republicans were divided on 46% to 45% lines on the question of if U.S. forces succeeded in their overall objectives. By January 2014, 52% of Republicans were supportive of military action in Iraq, with 38% saying the war had succeeded, showing that support for the war among Republicans has declined over time.

2009–2016

President Barack Obama, inaugurated in January 2009 and later reelected to a second term, continued the previous policy of keeping large-scale intervention in the War in Afghanistan, with a plan of removing combat troops while Afghan forces trained to replace them until late 2014. An October 2012 Pew Research Center poll found Republicans evenly divided at 48% over the choices of keeping American military forces in Afghanistan "until the situation has stabilized" analogous to Obama's policies versus making them leave "as soon as possible". An article in the news-magazine Foreign Policy stated that this represented a move from a previous "hawkish" stance by Republicans.

The Arab Spring

The Republican Party has been largely split on the attitude the United States should take in response to the events of the Arab Spring. Republican leadership in the House and Senate supported the 2011 military intervention in Libya, though many conservative congressional Republicans, such as Michele Bachmann, voted in opposition to the intervention. Similarly, many senior Republicans, including presidential candidates John McCain, Mitt Romney and Marco Rubio supported arming the Syrian rebels, while conservative Republicans in Congress proclaimed their opposition to this. Congressional Republicans, including Senate Minority Leader Mitch McConnell, were overwhelmingly opposed to the proposed US military intervention in Syria. In both Libya and Syria, Republicans opposed to intervention have cited Islamist influence within the rebel groups and a lack of U.S. national security interest as the reason for their opposition. During the 2016 presidential election cycle, many prominent Republicans, including John Kasich, Ted Cruz, Donald Trump and even figures typically associated with the interventionist wing of the party, such as Tom Cotton and Rudy Giuliani, have criticized the Democratic presidential nominee Hillary Clinton for her decision to support the intervention in Libya as Secretary of State.

Ukraine

Leading Republicans in Congress all supported sanctions against Russia in response to the 2014 Russian military intervention in Ukraine. No major politician of either party opposed the first rounds of American and EU sanctions in April 2014. A minority of Republicans, such as Congressman Dana Rohrabacher and Donald Trump, have been critical of U.S. support for the Ukrainian government, urging closer ties with Russia.

Iran

Both Republicans and Democrats in Congress have generally favored sanctions against Iran for its nuclear program. Congressional Republicans and 2016 Republican presidential candidates universally opposed approval of the Obama administration's Iran deal, which would lift sanctions in exchange for increased inspections of Iran's nuclear facilities.

2016–2021: Donald Trump

Russia
Under the leadership of President Donald Trump, the new Republican administration has shifted to a much less hawkish stance on the Russian Federation, with Republican leaders considering lifting sanctions on Russia and Trump nominating a Secretary of State, Rex Tillerson, who has strong ties to Russia.

There has also been a marked change in the attitudes of Republican voters towards Russian President Vladimir Putin. In July 2014, 66% of Republicans viewed Putin unfavorably, but as of December 2016, only 10% do so. Also in 2019 Morning Consult poll also found that Republicans and Republican-leaning independents where 21% more likely then Democrats and democratic-leaning independents to express confidence in Putin, though only 31% of Republicans stated they had confidence in Putin.

China

The Trump administration has demonstrated a more hostile stance towards the People's Republic of China, with Trump breaking U.S. diplomatic convention since the Shanghai Communiqué by taking a call from the President of the Republic of China Tsai Ing-wen, leading to a rebuke by the PRC government. There has been some speculation that the rapprochement with Russia is intended to isolate the PRC, which has shared strong relations with Russia over the past two decades after the fall of the Soviet Union and the Tiananmen Square protests.

Syria

The Trump administration has taken a different stance from the previous Obama administration on the issue of the Syrian Civil War, with UN Ambassador Nikki Haley and Secretary of State Rex Tillerson both stating in March 2017 that the United States would no longer prioritize the removal of Syrian President Bashar al-Assad from office, in line with Trump's stance during his campaign.

References

Republican Party (United States)